Nizar Hamdoon (1944 - July 4, 2003) was Iraq's ambassador to United States from 1984 to 1988 and the United Nations from 1992 to 1998. He was also the deputy Foreign Minister from 1988 to 1992 and under secretary of the Foreign Ministry from 1999 to his retirement in 2001.

A Muslim Arab from Mosul, Hamdoon finished his high school studies in Baghdad College then graduated from Baghdad University with a degree in architecture.

He gained attention in the West in 1998 during the Iraq disarmament crisis and the UNSCOM weapons inspections.

References

External links

1944 births
2003 deaths
People from Mosul
Iraqi diplomats
Arab Socialist Ba'ath Party – Iraq Region politicians
Ambassadors of Iraq to the United States
Permanent Representatives of Iraq to the United Nations
Iraqi Sunni Muslims
University of Baghdad alumni